Tyrväinen is the surname of the following people:

Antti Tyrväinen (1933–2013), Finnish biathlete
Antti Tyrväinen (born 1989), Finnish ice hockey player
Juhani Tyrväinen (born 1990), Finnish ice hockey player

Finnish-language surnames